Spy vs. Spy is a wordless black and white comic strip published in Mad magazine since 1961.

Spy vs. Spy may also refer to:

 Spy vs. Spy (1984 video game), the first computer game based on the comic strip.
 Spy vs. Spy II: The Island Caper
 Spy vs. Spy III: Arctic Antics
 Spy vs. Spy (2005 video game)
 Spy vs Spy (album), the 1989 recording of Ornette Coleman compositions by American multi-instrumentalist, John Zorn
 Spy vs. Spy (band), Australian rock band